Solesmes is a commune in the Sarthe department and Pays de la Loire region of north-western France.

Lying close to the small town of Sablé-sur-Sarthe and almost entirely agricultural in character, the commune is especially noted as the site of the Benedictine Abbey of St Peter, founded in 1010, suppressed by the National Constituent Assembly in 1791, and re-established by Dom Prosper Guéranger in 1833. A second abbey for women, St Cecilia's, is also located here.

See also
Communes of the Sarthe department

References

External links

St. Peter's Abbey official website
A complete and practical method of the Solesmes plain chant Cornell University Library Historical Monographs Collection.

Communes of Sarthe